Dazini is a tribe of cicadas in the family Cicadidae. There are at least four genera and about eight described species in Dazini.

Genera
These four genera belong to the tribe Dazini:
 Aragualna Champanhet, Boulard and Gaiani, 2000 i c g
 Daza Distant, 1905 i c g
 Onoralna Boulard, 1996 i c g
 Procollina Metcalf, 1952 i c g
Data sources: i = ITIS, c = Catalogue of Life, g = GBIF, b = Bugguide.net

References

Further reading

External links

 

Cicadettinae
Hemiptera tribes